Reign of the Supermen is a 2019 American animated science fiction superhero film produced by Warner Bros. Animation and DC Entertainment. The film is a direct sequel to the 2018 animated film The Death of Superman, based on the comic book story arc of the same name in "The Death of Superman" event. It is the twelfth film of the DC Animated Movie Universe and the 33rd film of the DC Universe Animated Original Movies. The film was released in limited Fathom Events theaters on January 13, 2019, and to digital and Blu-ray two days later.

Plot
Six months following Superman’s sacrifice and death at the hands of Doomsday, the crime rate in Metropolis has spread, while four new controversial Supermen have emerged. Lois Lane and Clark Kent's adoptive parents are still in mourning over his death. Lois has been investigating the new Supermen by gathering information from different sources.

Lex Luthor introduces a new Superman to the world at a press conference, who Lois discovers is actually a clone – Superboy created by Dr. Dabney Donovan. The conference is interrupted by the Eradicator, Steel and Cyborg Superman (who claims he is the true Superman) who fight each other until both the Eradicator and Cyborg Superman leave the battle. Unknown to anyone, Superman has just barely survived his battle with Doomsday and is recuperating at the Fortress of Solitude as the Eradicator rejuvenates his DNA. That night, Cyborg Superman visits Lois in an attempt to convince her he isn't a fake. Lex becomes frustrated with Superboy for his childish actions.

The Justice League, accompanied by Superboy, are hired as bodyguards for the President, who is unveiling their new Watchtower. The presentation is suddenly attacked by Parademons, summoned via a boom tube portal. The League are mysteriously transported to another planet and declared dead while Cyborg Superman rescues the president and is announced to the world as the true Superman. Angered, Lex reveals to Superboy he shares his DNA and kills Dr. Donovan after he explains to Lex that Superboy is the best clone they could create. With the help of Steel, Lois discovers Cyborg Superman is the deceased astronaut Hank Henshaw who blames Superman for not saving him and his wife and has decided to destroy his legacy by impersonating him. Henshaw reveals to the world his new "Cyber Corps" militia, which are created by Mother Boxes infused with humans.

Steel tracks the Eradicator to the Fortress, where he learns that Superman is currently going through a revitalization cycle, and the two engage in a fight. The fight is broadcast to Lois’ phone. Lois realizes that the Eradicator is a hologram from Superman's ship's matrix, created to protect Superman. The fight stops when a depowered Superman is revived. Through Henshaw's technology, Lex and Lois discover that Henshaw is being controlled by Darkseid from Apokolips, who created Doomsday and orchestrated its attack on Earth.

Superman, Superboy and Steel head towards Metropolis. Lex sends Lois to the Watchtower as he uses a Mother Box to rescue the League. Darkseid continues to torment Henshaw for his failure to keep Superman dead and attempts to open a portal for his arrival, using the Mother Box infused with Henshaw. Henshaw rips out the Mother Box inside him, deactivating Darkseid's control over the Cyber Corps. Before Henshaw can kill Lois, Superman arrives. Henshaw blames Superman for his wife Terri's death. Superman eventually regains his powers from the sun and deactivates Henshaw by stabbing his forehead with a crystal taken from the Fortress of Solitude containing the Eradicator program. Henshaw's defeat also deactivates the Cyber Corps, unfortunately killing them in the process.

In the aftermath, Martian Manhunter disguises himself as Superman to announce Clark Kent's safe return with the cover up of him being missing during the Doomsday attack. Superboy is sent to live with the Kents and is named "Conner". In a post-credit scene, the League gather at the Watchtower to confront Darkseid themselves, with Lex inviting himself in.

Voice cast

Release
Reign of the Supermen was released and distributed by Warner Bros. Home Entertainment in limited Fathom Events theaters on January 13 and 14, 2019, followed by Digital HD on January 15, then Ultra HD Blu-ray Combo Pack and Blu-ray Combo Pack on January 29, but disc releases were moved up to January 15. The film was re-released on home video, edited together with its predecessor, on October 1 as The Death and Return of Superman. Limited Edition gift-set also includes Steel figure, Superman: Doomsday, bonus animated episodes (blu-ray).

Reception
Reign of the Supermen earned $3,413,951 from domestic home video sales.

Notes

References

External links

DC page: ROTS
Warner Bros. Entertainment Inc. page: TDAROS

2019 direct-to-video films
2019 animated films
2019 films
2010s American animated films
2010s animated superhero films
Animated Superman films
DC Animated Movie Universe
2010s English-language films
Resurrection in film
Films set in 2019
Films directed by Sam Liu
Films scored by Frederik Wiedmann